Quiaca District is one of ten districts of the province Sandia in Peru.

Geography 
The Apolobamba mountain range traverses the district. Some of the highest mountains of the districtare listed below:

 Ananea
 Chimpa Qiswarani
 K'ayrani
 Liqiliqini
 Qaqinkurani
 Qucha Kunka
 Quchapata
 Rit'ipata
 Wanakuni
 Wilaquta
 Yana Urqu

Ethnic groups 
The people in the district are mainly indigenous citizens of Quechua descent. Quechua is the language which the majority of the population (83.15%) learnt to speak in childhood, 15.21% of the residents started speaking using the Spanish language (2007 Peru Census).

References